Abrotanella rosulata is a plant in the family Asteraceae, endemic to the Campbell Islands.

Description 
The leaves overlap, and are recurved, rigid, and leathery. They are 1/4-1/3 in long, narrow ovate or lanceolate, acute, concave above. The flower heads are aggregated amongst the upper leaves and  1/10 in long. There are 8-10 involucral scales which are linear oblong, and leathery with translucent veins. The male flower has a four-angled corolla, and the angles are translucent. The female flower has a tubular corolla, and is four-toothed. The achene is four-angled.

Taxonomy
It was first described in 1844 as Ceratella rosulata by Joseph Dalton Hooker  who found it in the Campbell Islands, "in crevices of rocks at the tops of the mountains, at an elevation of 1400 feet", but in 1864 he amended the genus to Abrotanella.

Conservation status
In 2009 and 2012, it was declared "At  Risk - Naturally Uncommon" under the New Zealand Threat Classification System. In 2018 its status remained as "At  Risk - Naturally Uncommon" due to its restricted range.

References

External links

Flora of the Campbell Islands
Plants described in 1844
Taxa named by Joseph Dalton Hooker
rosulata